The Highway Act 1835 (5 & 6 Will 4 c 50) is an Act of the Parliament of the United Kingdom. It was one of the Highway Acts 1835 to 1885.

Parish boards
The Highway Act 1835 placed highways under the direction of parish surveyors, and allowed them to pay for the costs involved by rates levied on the occupiers of land. The surveyor's duty is to keep the highways in repair, and if a highway is out of repair, the surveyor may be summoned before the courts and ordered to complete the repairs within a limited time. The surveyor is also charged with the removal of nuisances on the highway. A highway nuisance may be abated by any person, and may be made the subject of indictment at common law.

The board consists of representatives of the various parishes, called way wardens together with the justices for the county residing within the district. Salaries and similar expenses incurred by the board are charged on a district fund to which the several parishes contribute; but each parish remains separately responsible for the expenses of maintaining its own highways.

The amending acts, while not interfering with the operation of the principal act, authorize the creation of highway districts on a larger scale. The justices of a county may convert it or any portion of it into a highway district to be governed by a highway board, the powers and responsibilities of which will be the same as those of the parish surveyor under the former act.

New road offences
The Highway Act 1835 specified as offences for which the driver of a carriage on the public highway might be punished by a fine, in addition to any civil action that might be brought against him:

Riding upon the cart, or upon any horse drawing it, and not having some other person to guide it, unless there be some person driving it.
Negligence causing damage to person or goods being conveyed on the highway
Quitting his cart, or leaving control of the horses, or leaving the cart so as to be an obstruction on the highway.
Not having the owner's name painted up.
Refusing to give the same.
Driving animals or a 'carriage of any description' on the footway.
Not keeping on the left or near side of the road, when meeting any other carriage or horse. This rule does not apply in the case of a carriage meeting a foot-passenger, but a driver is bound to use due care to avoid driving against any person crossing the highway on foot. At the same time a passenger crossing the highway is also bound to use due care in avoiding vehicles, and the mere fact of a driver being on the wrong side of the road would not be evidence of negligence in such a case.
The playing of football on public highways, with a maximum penalty of forty shillings.

Section 72
Section 72 provides: "If any person shall wilfully ride upon any footpath or causeway by the side of any road made or set apart for the use or accommodation of foot passengers; or shall wilfully lead or drive any horse, ass, sheep, mule, swine, or cattle or carriage of any description, or any truck or sledge, upon any such footpath or causeway; or shall tether any horse, ass, mule, swine, or cattle, on any highway, so as to suffer or permit the tethered animal to be thereon."

This clause is referred to by the current Highway Code:
 (The offence of driving on a bridleway is covered by a later act)(The Department for Transport cited this section in 2006 when it ruled that Segways could not be legally used on pavements in the United Kingdom.) 1973

Related and subsequent acts
The Public Health Act 1875 vested the powers and duties of surveyors of highways and vestries in urban authorities,

The Local Government Act 1888 gave the responsibility of maintaining main roads to county councils.

Notes

References
Documents referenced from 'Notes' section

  

Other references for article

External links

1835 in British law
United Kingdom Acts of Parliament 1835
1835 in transport
Transport policy in the United Kingdom
Transport legislation
History of transport in the United Kingdom